Aamby Valley Airport  is a small airport located in the state of Maharashtra, India. The airport is only used by private aircraft and does not have scheduled flights. In 2019 the airport was included in the UDAN regional connectivity scheme.

References

Airports in Maharashtra
Lonavala-Khandala
Airports with year of establishment missing